"Beautiful" is a single released by Taylor Dayne in late 2007 as the lead single from her 5th studio album Satisfied. In the spring of 2008 the single reached number 1 on the US Dance chart becoming her third song to reach the peak position. The song is written by Taylor Dayne and Hitesh Ceon of production team Element, and produced by Hitesh Ceon and Richie Jones.

Charts

Weekly charts

Year-end charts

References

2008 singles
Taylor Dayne songs
Songs written by Taylor Dayne
2008 songs
Songs written by Hitesh Ceon